The Academic High School in Toruń (Polish: Uniwersyteckie Liceum Ogólnokształcące w Toruniu, ULO) is a public high school located in Toruń, Poland and founded on January 21, 1998. The high school is supervised by Nicolaus Copernicus University and some of the classes are conducted by the university's lecturers. It is the first high school in Poland especially created for outstanding students. It is considered as one of the best and most prestigious high schools in Poland.

History

The Academic High School was established in 1998 by Nicolaus Copernicus University, but its tradition refers to Schola Thoruniensis (turned into the Academic Gymnasium in Toruń) founded in the 16th century as well as to the Jan and Jędrzej Śniadecki High School established by the Vilnius University in the interwar period.

Ranking

References

External links
 Official website

Nicolaus Copernicus University in Toruń
Schools in Poland
High schools in Poland
Educational institutions established in 1998
1998 establishments in Poland
Co-educational boarding schools